Mundijong railway station is a station on the South Western Line in Western Australia served by the twice daily Australind which operates between Perth and Bunbury.

Description

Mundijong railway station is located along the South Western Railway within Mundijong, Western Australia, on the outskirts of Perth. The station building is listed on the Shire of Serpentine-Jarrahdale Local Heritage Survey.

History
The station was opened in 1893 and was originally named Jarrahdale Junction. This was due to being the location where the Rockingham to Jarrahdale line between 1872 to 1962 intersected with the south west line.

The name changed to Mundijong Junction in March 1902, later the name was simplified to Mundijong.  The station building was surveyed for other uses in 1995.  The station was staffed from 27 July 1893 to 31 October 1985, with the at least one station master being identified as a local pioneer. In 1999 the station platform and new buildings were relocated to the other side of the line.

Services 
Mundijong station is served by the twice-daily Australind train service from Perth to Bunbury. Mundijong is planned to become connected with Transperth services.

References

Railway stations in Perth, Western Australia
Shire of Serpentine-Jarrahdale
South Western Railway, Western Australia
Railway stations in Australia opened in 1893